The Mixed 25 metre pistol SH1 event at the 2008 Summer Paralympics took place on September 10 at the Beijing Shooting Range Hall. In the qualification round groups 1-3 were precision, 4-6 rapid-fire.

Qualification round

Q Qualified for final

Final

References

Shooting at the 2008 Summer Paralympics